The Man Who Couldn't Say No (German: Der Mann, der nicht nein sagen konnte) is a 1958 comedy film directed by  and starring Heinz Rühmann, Hannelore Schroth and Siegfried Lowitz. It represented an early co-production between the Danish company Rialto Film and the German distributor Constantin Film.

The film's sets were designed by the art director Erik Aaes. It was shot at studios in Hellerup in Copenhagen and at the Bavaria Studios in Munich.

Cast
Heinz Rühmann as Thomas Träumer 
Hannelore Schroth as Eva Träumer 
Siegfried Lowitz as Alfons Ulrich 
Ursula Heyer as Bettina 
Renate Ewert as Marilzn 
Helga Münster as Hilde 
Franz-Otto Krüger as Kommisar Kümmelmann 
Wolfgang Kieling as Untersuchungsrichter 
Willi Rose as Polizei-Wachtmeister 
Erwin Linder as Polizei-Reviervorsteher 
Carl Voscherau as Gefängniswachtmeister 
Clemens Hasse as Angestellter beim Hundezwinger 
Inge Stolten as Fürsorgerin

References

Bibliography
Bock, Hans-Michael & Bergfelder, Tim. The Concise CineGraph. Encyclopedia of German Cinema. Berghahn Books, 2009.

External links

1958 comedy films
Danish comedy films
Swiss comedy films
German comedy films
West German films
Films directed by Kurt Früh
Films shot in Copenhagen
Constantin Film films
Films shot at Bavaria Studios
1950s German films
1950s German-language films